Nancy Mackay (née Murrall; 6 April 1922 – 2016) was a Canadian sprinter. Mackay won a bronze medal in the 4 × 100 m relay at the 1948 Summer Olympics.

MacKay was born in England, and moved to Canada when she was four years old. In the 1930s she started training in athletics and won six national titles between 1936 and 1941. She missed the 1940 Olympics due to World War II, and was selected as a reserve for the 1948 Games. She was asked to replace Millie Cheater shortly before the 4 × 100 m race, and ran the fastest leg of the Canadian team. The same year MacKay retired from competitions.

MacKay was inducted into the Oshawa Sports Hall of Fame in 1986 and into the Athletics Ontario Hall of Fame in 2011.

References

1922 births
2016 deaths
Sportspeople from Smethwick
British emigrants to Canada
Canadian female sprinters
Olympic bronze medalists for Canada
Athletes (track and field) at the 1948 Summer Olympics
Olympic track and field athletes of Canada
Medalists at the 1948 Summer Olympics
Olympic bronze medalists in athletics (track and field)
Olympic female sprinters